Jan Holub  may refer to:

 Jan Holub (ice hockey) (born 1983), Czech ice hockey player
 Jan Holub I (born 1942), Czechoslovakian speedway rider
 Jan Holub II (born 1968), Czechoslovakian and Czech speedway rider
 Jan Holub III (born 1991), Czech speedway rider